Jon Keith Diebler (born June 22, 1988) is an American former professional basketball player who is the director of recruiting for the Butler Bulldogs of the Big East Conference. He played four seasons of college basketball at Ohio State University.

High school career
Diebler played his freshman season along with his older brother Jake at Fostoria High School for his father, head coach Keith Diebler.  The family left when Keith accepted the head coaching position at Upper Sandusky High School, which Jon attended for his remaining three seasons.

He scored 77 points in a 105–100 win over Tiffin Columbian as a junior. In Jon's sophomore year, the Upper Sandusky Rams won the state championship, coached by his father. As a senior, he averaged 41.2 points, 12.3 rebounds, and six assists per game. Diebler ended his high school career with 3,208 points, more than Ohio high school greats Luke Kennard (2,977), Jay Burson (2,958), LeBron James (2,646), Bob Huggins (2,438), Jerry Lucas (2,438), Jamar Butler (2,412) and Jim Jackson (2,328).

He won Mr. Basketball his senior year and led his team on a trip to the state championship. Despite having his nose broken in three places on a layup attempt in the final quarter of the Division II regional championship game, he helped the team reach the state finals game while scoring 48 points in a two-point loss to Dayton Dunbar. It was the third-highest scoring effort ever in an OHSAA state championship game.

Considered a four-star recruit by Rivals.com, Diebler was listed as the No. 14 shooting guard and the No. 60 player in the nation in 2007.

College career
On March 13, 2010, Diebler surpassed Jamar Butler for the Ohio State record for 3-point field goals made. Diebler finished the 2009–10 season averaging 37.2 minutes per game.  On March 1, 2011, he made 10 3-pointers in a row while finishing 10 for 12, breaking the Ohio State record for most 3-pointers in a game. On March 6, 2011, during Ohio State's senior day, Diebler made 7 3-pointers, finishing with 27 points against Wisconsin.

Diebler started 115 games during his time at OSU, including every game since the start of his sophomore year.

Professional career

Panionios (2011–2012)
In August 2011, Diebler signed a one-year contract with the Greek Basket League club Panionios.

Pınar Karşıyaka (2012–2015)
On July 25, 2012, Diebler signed a contract with the Turkish club Pınar Karşıyaka. With Karşıyaka, he won the Turkish Super League championship of the 2014–15 season.

Anadolu Efes (2015–2016)
On July 23, 2015, Diebler signed a one-year contract with the Turkish club Anadolu Efes.

Galatasaray (2016–2017)
On July 8, 2016, Diebler signed with the Turkish club Galatasaray Odeabank.

Beşiktaş (2017–2018)
On June 23, 2017, Diebler joined Beşiktaş on a one-year deal. He averaged 11.5 points per game in the Basketball Champions League.

Darüşşafaka (2018–2019)
On August 18, 2018, Diebler signed a one-year deal with Darüşşafaka of the EuroLeague.

Hapoel Tel Aviv (2020–2021)
On September 6, 2020, Diebler signed with Hapoel Tel Aviv of the Israeli Basketball Premier League. On September 27, 2021, Diebler announced his retirement from professional basketball.

Diebler joined Carmen's Crew, composed primarily of Ohio State alumni, in The Basketball Tournament 2020. He scored 11 points as the team was upset by House of Paign, 76–68, in the first round.

NBA draft rights
On June 6, 2011, Diebler traveled to Portland, to participate in a pre-draft workout with the Portland Trail Blazers. Diebler was then drafted in the 2nd round of the 2011 NBA draft by the Trail Blazers. On July 20, 2012, Diebler's draft rights were traded to the Houston Rockets, in a three team deal.

On January 22, 2019, his draft rights were included in a trade to the Chicago Bulls, along with Carmelo Anthony and cash considerations, in exchange for the right to Tadija Dragićević.

Coaching career
On April 19, 2022, Diebler was hired as the director of recruiting for the Butler Bulldogs.

References

External links
Euroleague.net profile
Eurobasket.com profile
TBLStat.net Profile
Ohio State Buckeyes bio
College stats

1988 births
Living people
American expatriate basketball people in Greece
American expatriate basketball people in Turkey
American men's basketball players
Anadolu Efes S.K. players
Basketball players from Ohio
Beşiktaş men's basketball players
Galatasaray S.K. (men's basketball) players
Hapoel Tel Aviv B.C. players
Karşıyaka basketball players
Ohio State Buckeyes men's basketball players
Panionios B.C. players
Parade High School All-Americans (boys' basketball)
People from Sylvania, Ohio
People from Upper Sandusky, Ohio
Portland Trail Blazers draft picks
Shooting guards
Small forwards